John Dustan Msonthi was a Malawian politician. He served as a Cabinet Minister and translator during the government of Kamuzu Banda.

Personal life

Msonthi was a Roman Catholic son of an Anglican clergyman, Reverend Canon Msonthi. He left the church because he did not see the Anglican church as consistent with his politics. His brother, Boniface Msonthi, was an activist in the National African Congress, and a government Minister in the 1960s and 1970s.

Political life

Translator 
He worked for Kamuzu Banda, the Minister of Transport and Communication. Banda could not speak Chichewa and needed a translator. Kamuzu’s message was relayed by his interpreter, John Msonthi. From 1958 until the 1970s he deciphered English into Chichewa using expressions, proverbs and metaphors that mesmerized Malawians. These messages were vital in the Malawian fight for Independence. Msonthi was later replaced by John Tembo.

Minister 
During the cabinet crisis of 1964, Msonthi, along with Yatuta Chisiza and Willie Chokani, resigned from Banda's cabinet to protest his dismissal of Kanyama Chiume, Orton Chirwa, and  Augustine Bwanausi. Msonthi withdrew his resignation a few hours later. Banda reinstated Msonthi as Minister of Transport and Communication.

While he was Minister, a bill was passed that established the powers of the Censorship Board. It allowed the board to dispose of undesirable publications without challenge. It was claimed that its passage would allow Malawi standards and interests of morality, decency and public order to prevail in entertainment and publications. It was opposed by Michael Blackwood, a spokesman for European settler interests. Msonthi noted that, "It is our duty, as a government, to
make sure that people who take any films in this country for show or their private use, do so in accordance with the decency and morality of this country. We must make sure that what they photograph is the right thing." The bill was passed with three readings and within three days. The Censorship Board was run by Tobias Banda.

Death 
Msonthi was later killed.

References

20th-century Malawian politicians
Year of death missing
Place of birth missing
Year of birth missing